Huayllabamba is a town in Southern Peru, capital of the district Huayllabamba in the province Urubamba in the region Cusco. It is located in what is known as the Sacred valley of the Incas.

References

External links
Satellite map at Maplandia

Populated places in the Cusco Region